The Concha Revolution (1912–1916) was an outcome of the assassination of liberal Ecuadorian leader Eloy Alfaro  --  responsible for the Liberal Revolution of 1895  --  on January 28, 1912, in Quito. In the north of Ecuador, the citizens of Esmeraldas, especially the Afro-Esmeraldans, were loyal to the liberal cause and the ensuing struggle left many of the poorly armed blacks dead at the hands of government troops. This uprising in support of Alfaro was against a more conservative wing of the Liberal party. Ecuadorian blacks contributed notably to the military effort and even formed the bulk of Alfaro’s army in the region. The Esmeraldan rebel army was led and funded by Colonel Carlos Concha y Torres (1864–1919). This civil war left a bitter legacy in the region.

The novel Cuando los guayacanes florecían (1954) by Estupiñán Bass recounts the events of the Concha Revolution.

References
Maloney, Gerardo F. (1995), “El negro y la cuestión negro”, Nueva historia del Ecuador; Editor, Enrique Ayala Mora; 13 vols; Quito, Ecuador: Grijalbo.
Foote, Nicola (2008), Entry: “Esmeraldas”, Encyclopedia of the African Diaspora: Origins, Experiences, and Culture, Vol 1; Editor, Carole Boyce Davies; Santa Barbara, California: ABC-CLIO; pp. 422–423.

History of Ecuador
1912 in Ecuador